NBAC may refer to:
 National Building Arts Center
 North Baltimore Aquatic Club